The FIFA World Coach of the Year was an association football award given annually to the football coach who is considered to have performed the best in the previous 12 months. It was awarded based on votes from coaches and captains of international teams, as well as journalists from around the world.

The award started in 2010 after France Football's Ballon d'Or and the FIFA World Player of the Year award were merged. José Mourinho was the first winner of the men's FIFA World Coach of the Year award in 2010. The women's version of the award was won by head coach Silvia Neid in 2010. Starting in 2016 this award was replaced with the Best FIFA Football Coach Award.

Winners

FIFA World Coach of the Year for Men's Football

FIFA World Coach of the Year for Women's Football

Wins by manager

See also

 The Best FIFA Football Coach (2016–present)
 FIFA Ballon d'Or
 FIFA World Player of the Year
 FIFA Puskás Award
 European Coach of the Year
 European Coach of the Season

References

External links

2013 Results

Coach of the Year
 Fifa World
Awards established in 2010
Awards disestablished in 2015